Suzanne Nicole Virdee (born 16 October 1969 in Solihull, Warwickshire, now the West Midlands) is a British journalist and television presenter, working on a freelance basis with UK news organisation ITN.

Career
Virdee became a journalist at the age of 18, working as a trainee reporter at the Solihull Times in her home town. She passed her journalism exams and switched to television journalism, working for Central News in Birmingham. Virdee went on to work for the Sunday Mercury and the Birmingham Mail (then the Birmingham Evening Mail) before a 16-month stint with BBC WM.

She returned to Central News as a reporter, presenter and producer before joining the BBC's Midlands Today programme in April 2001, presenting late night bulletins before becoming a main presenter a year later, alongside Nick Owen. Virdee has also worked as a relief presenter for BBC Breakfast.

On 29 March 2012, Virdee left Midlands Today after announcing she was unable to sign a five-month contract to continue presenting the programme. The BBC took Virdee off air two days earlier than planned after she released a press statement about her departure.

In August 2016, she joined ITN as a news correspondent for the ITV Lunchtime News and early newsreader for ITV News London. On 25 May 2017 she made her debut fronting short updates for 5 News and covered bulletins for ITV news.

References

External links

 
 Interview with Suzanne Virdee on Channel 4's IdeasFactory
 

1969 births
Living people
People from Solihull
British television presenters
BBC newsreaders and journalists
ITN newsreaders and journalists
ITV regional newsreaders and journalists